Hits 52 is a compilation album released in the UK in March 2002. It contains 40 tracks over two CDs, including three number one singles on the UK Singles Chart from Will Young, Westlife, and Daniel Bedingfield.

The music video for Will Young's "Evergreen" was featured as a bonus enhanced feature on disc two.

Track listing
Disc one

Disc two

External links
 Hits 52 @ Discogs

2002 compilation albums
Hits (compilation series) albums